Suzhal: The Vortex is an Indian Tamil-language crime thriller streaming television series created by Pushkar–Gayathri for Amazon Prime Video. Set in the fictional town of Saambaloor set in Tamil Nadu, the series is an investigation into the case of a missing person which unravels and rips the intricate social fabric of the small town. It stars actors R. Parthiban, Kathir, Aishwarya Rajesh and Sriya Reddy.

The series was directed by Bramma G and Anucharan Murugaiyan and produced by Wallwatcher Films.The first season consists of eight episodes and it started streaming from 17 June 2022.
The web-series features music composed by Sam C.S., cinematography handled by Mukeswaran & editing done by Richard Kevin, and production design by Arun Venjaramoodu. A second season is being planned.

Premise 
In the town of Sambaloor set in Nilgiris District, Tamil Nadu, lives a community that worships Goddess Angalamman. The community celebrates a festival over 10 days every year, and it is in these 10 days that this story unfolds. What starts out as parallel stories of kidnapping and arson, later unfolds into childhood trauma and conspiracy.

Cast 

 R. Parthiban as Shanmugam
 Kathir as Sub-inspector Chakravarthy “Sakkarai”
 Aishwarya Rajesh as Nandini (Shanmugam's older daughter)
 Sriya Reddy as Inspector Regina Thomas
 Gopika Ramesh as Nila (Shanmugam's younger daughter)
 Fredrick Jhonson as Adhisayam (Regina's son)
 Harish Uthaman as Trilok Vadde
 Prem Kumar as Vadivelu (Regina's husband)
 Elango Kumaravel as Guna
 Nivedhithaa Sathish as Lakshmi (Sakkarai's fiancée)
 Indumathy Manikandan as Devi
 Latha Rao as Selvi (Guna's wife)
 Yusuf Hussain as Mukesh Vadde
 Nitish Veera as Pushparaj
 Santhana Bharathi as Kothandaraman
 Mekha Rajan as Dr. Sanghamithra (psychiatrist)
 Palani Murugan as Eeshwaran
 Soundarya as Malar (Nila's friend)
 Ajith Koshy as DSP Manimaran
 Navneeth Krishnan as Gani
 Yashwanth Babu as Mani
 G Ajith Kumar as Kandipan
 Hareesh SS as Dheena
 Sasi Kumar as Arivu
 Arun Pandiyan as Muthu
 Prasanna Balachandran as Sundaram
 Mona Kakade as a hospital doctor

Episodes

Season 1

Music 
The music is composed by Sam C. S. The first season consist of 13 songs.

Season 1

Release 
The series has been released in over 30 languages through subtitles and has been dubbed in Hindi, Telugu, Malayalam, Kannada, English, French, German, Italian, Japanese, Polish, Portuguese, Castilian Spanish, Latin Spanish, Arabic, and Turkish.

Reception 
Saibal Chatterjee of NDTV rated the series 4 out of 5 stars and wrote, "The Vortex sets a benchmark that will take some doing to emulate". Logesh Balachandran of The Times Of India rated the series 4 out of 5 stars and wrote, "Suzhal is an intense investigative thriller that has a lot of surprises in store, making it a perfect bingewatch for the weekend". Divya Nair of Rediff rated the series 4 out of 5 stars and wrote "Even though each episode is about an hour long, you won't even blink". Srivatsan S of The Hindu wrote, "A terrific star cast makes this layered series all the more effective", further adding that, "this is a rare series where the sum and parts are equally great". Nandini Ramnath writing for Scroll.in called the series "a nail-biting thriller about secrets & deceptions".

The series received criticism from Manoj Kumar B of Indian Express, who though praised the series for seemingly "being like a huge jump by the standards of Tamil soap operas", also criticised it for not being good enough to match the global standards & stated that the "show's creators have barely scratched the surface with this format of storytelling". Janani K of India Today rated the series 2.5 out of 5 stars and wrote, "Aishwarya Rajesh, Kathir's series sucks you right in but fizzles", though she praised the climax by writing that, "Pushkar and Gayatri’s Suzhal imparts a much-needed message in the climax, which is relevant to society".

References

External links 
 

2022 Tamil-language television series debuts
Amazon Prime Video original programming
Tamil-language web series
Tamil-language thriller television series
Tamil-language crime television series